Cattasoma is a genus of true flies in the family Sarcophagidae.

Species
C. festinans Reinhard, 1947
C. mcalpinei Lopes, 1988
C. mediocre Reinhard, 1947

References 

Sarcophagidae
Schizophora genera